Alessandro Cardelli (born 7 May 1991) is a Sammarinese politician and one of the Captains Regent with Mirko Dolcini. Their joint terms was from 1 October 2020 until 1 April 2021. He was the youngest state leader in the world, and also was the only head of state under 30 years of age as for 2021.

Life
Born in Italy, he grew up in Borgo Maggiore in San Marino. Graduated in 2015 in Law from the Libera Università Internazionale degli Studi Sociali Guido Carli in Rome, he worked as a lawyer and notary in the Republic of San Marino.

At the age of 18 he enrolled to the Sammarinese Christian Democratic Party, formerly a member of the Governing Council of this party youth movement.

Following the political elections of 11 November 2012 he became a Member of the Grand and General Council for his party and was sworn in by the Heads of State on 5 December 2012 at the age of 21 years and 212 days, becoming the youngest parliamentarian in the history of the Republic.

In the general elections of November 20, 2016 he was re-elected as a Member of the Great and General Council. On 20 December 2016 he was appointed Group Leader of the Council Group of the Christian Democratic Party of San Marino for the XVIII legislature.

See also
List of youngest state leaders since 1900

References

1991 births
Living people
People from Cesena
Sammarinese people of Italian descent
Libera Università Internazionale degli Studi Sociali Guido Carli alumni
Captains Regent of San Marino
Members of the Grand and General Council
Sammarinese lawyers
Sammarinese Christian Democratic Party politicians